The Frauenau Dam ( or Trinkwasserspeicher Frauenau) in the Bavarian Forest, was built in 1983 to ensure the drinking water supply to large parts of Lower Bavaria.

Description 
Because there was a shortage of groundwater in the Bavarian Forest due to the geological situation there, in the years 1976 to 1983  a water storage reservoir was built near Frauenau and Zwiesel, that was fed by the Kleiner Regen and Hirschbach rivers which rose in the unsettled area on the Czech border between the Falkenstein and Rachel.

See also 
List of dams in Germany
List of tallest dams

References

Literature 
 Trinkwassertalsperre Frauenau, Heft 17 in der Schriftenreihe Wasserwirtschaft in Bayern, Oberste Baubehörde im Bayer. Innenministerium, 1984, .
 Talsperren in der Bundesrepublik Deutschland, Peter Franke, Wolfgang Frey, DNK - DVWK 1987,

External links 

 
 Trinkwassertalsperre Frauenau - Stamm- und Qualitätsdaten (pdf file; 334 kB)

Dams in Bavaria
RFrauenau Reservoir
Bavarian Forest
Buildings and structures in Regen (district)
1980s architecture
Rock-filled dams